Even Mice Belong in Heaven is a 2021 coproduction animated film directed by Jan Bubeníček and Denisa Grimmová. It is based on the book Mice Go to Heaven by Iva Procházková. It received two Czech Lion Awards - for Best animated film and for Best music. It also on Czech Film Critics' Award for Best audiovisual creation. The film was presented at Shanghai International Film Festival where it received award for the Best animated film. It is the most expensive Czech animated film.

Plot 
After a fatal accident, the cheeky mouse Whizzy and the fox Whitebelly meet again in animal heaven.

Voice cast
 Pavlína Balner as Whizzy 
 Matouš Ruml as Whitebelly

Production
The film is based on the children's book Mice Go to Heaven by Iva Procházková with illustrations by Marine Ludin. In it, a little mouse called Whizzy flees from the hungry fox Whitebelly, misses a root, stumbles and falls off a high rock. Arriving in animal heaven, Whizzy finds swings, carousels and many other attractions.

Born in Paris, Ludin studied at the Ecole Nationale Supérieure d'Art in Nancy and illustration at the University of Applied Sciences in Hamburg with Rüdiger Stoye, graduating as a qualified designer in 2005. Since then, Ludin has worked as a freelance illustrator for German and French publishers . The Czech Procházková lived with her family in Germany for ten years. before returning to Prague. Her children's and youth books have been nominated for the Hans Christian Andersen Medal and the Catholic Children's and Youth Book Prize and have been awarded the Friedrich Gerstäcker Prize, the Evangelical Book Prize and the German Youth Literature Prize. Ivan Pokorný had already filmed Procházková's youth novel Orange Days, which is set in the Lusatian mountains.

Even Mice Belong in Heaven was adapted for the film by director and screenwriter Alice Nellis, who has won several Český lev awards, and Richard Malatinský, who previously worked mainly on teleseries. Directed by Jan Bubeníček and Denisa Grimmová. For Grimmová it is the first full-length film. Bubeníček previously directed the feature film Smrtelné historky.

Myši patří do nebe, the original title of the film, was made in the Barrandov Studios in Prague. In addition to stop motion, CGI was also used. Animators include Frantisek Vasa, Piotr Ficner, Vojtech Kiss, Michal Kubíček, Katarzyna Okoniewska, Viliam Vala and Matous Valchar. The production design was created by director Denisa Grimmová and Jan Kurka. Radek Loukota acted as cameraman.

The film premiered in June at the Annecy Festival d'Animation. Performances at the Karlovy Vary Film Festival and the Edinburgh International Film Festival followed in August 2021. In October 2021 it was shown at the Hamburg Film Festival and the Festival International du Film Francophone de Namur. It was released in Czech cinemas on October 7, 2021, and in French cinemas on October 27. Launch in Slovakia was scheduled for January 13, 2022. It will be screened at the Leeds Film Festival in April 2022. The theatrical release in Poland took place on April 29, 2022. It will be screened at the Revolution Perth International Film Festival in July 2022.

Soundtrack
The film music was composed by Krzysztof A. Janczak. In October 2021, MovieScore Media released the soundtrack album with a total of 35 tracks as a download.

References

External links
 
 Even Mice Belong in Heaven at CSFD.cz 

2021 films
Czech adventure films
Czech animated films
Czech comedy films
Czech fantasy films
French adventure films
French animated films
French comedy films
French fantasy films
Polish adventure films
Polish animated films
Polish comedy films
Polish fantasy films
Slovak animated films
2020s Czech-language films
2021 animated films
Czech Lion Awards winners (films)
Slovak fantasy films
2020s French films
Czech animated adventure films
Czech animated fantasy films